Randy Mazey (born May 23, 1966) is an American college baseball coach. He is the head baseball coach at West Virginia University, a position he had held since the 2013 season. Mazey attended Clemson University, where he played baseball for the Tigers from 1985 to 1988. Following a brief professional playing career, Mazey began his coaching career in 1990 as an assistant at Clemson. He was the head coach of Charleston Southern from 1994 to 1996 and East Carolina from 2003 to 2005, leading both teams to NCAA Division I Tournament appearances. After seven years as an assistant at TCU, Mazey was named the head coach at West Virginia in July 2012. Mazey was named the Big 12 Conference Baseball Coach of the Year in 2019.

Head coaching record
Below is a table of Mazey's yearly records as a head baseball coach.

See also
 List of current NCAA Division I baseball coaches

References

1966 births
Living people
Charleston Southern Buccaneers baseball coaches
Clemson Tigers baseball coaches
Clemson Tigers baseball players
Burlington Indians players (1986–2006)
East Carolina Pirates baseball coaches
Georgia Bulldogs baseball coaches
Miami Miracle players
Sportspeople from Johnstown, Pennsylvania
TCU Horned Frogs baseball coaches
Tennessee Volunteers baseball coaches
West Virginia Mountaineers baseball coaches
Baseball coaches from Pennsylvania